The Town of Eaton is a Statutory Town located in Weld County, Colorado, United States. The town population was 5,802 at the 2020 United States Census, a +32.92% increase since the 2010 United States Census. Eaton is a part of the Greeley, CO Metropolitan Statistical Area and the Front Range Urban Corridor.

History
The town is named after Benjamin Harrison Eaton, a pioneer of irrigation who played a leading role in transforming the arid prairie of the Great Plains east of Colorado's Front Range into a thriving agricultural region with water brought from the nearby Rocky Mountains in the late 19th century. Much of the farming country around Eaton, Colorado continues to depend on the irrigation systems engineered by Eaton and others to this day. Eaton later served as Governor of Colorado from 1885 to 1887. The town of Eaton was incorporated in 1892. Eaton was first named Eatonton to avoid conflict with the Easton post office in El Paso county. When Easton had changed its name to Eastonville, the last syllable of Eatonton was dropped, and the town has since been known as Eaton.

The first citizens of Eaton began to settle in 1880. One of the only occupations available was working on irrigation ditches from Eaton to Greeley.

On September 28, 1892, a petition was submitted to the county judge requesting that Eaton be incorporated. The petition had been signed by 36 residents, including Benjamin Eaton himself. The county judge ordered that an election be held to decide whether or not the remaining residents desired Eaton to be incorporated. 50 votes were cast, every one of them in favor of incorporation. Eaton's incorporation was affected on October 27, 1892.

Geography
Eaton is located at  (40.529481, -104.713177), on the Denver, Colorado-Cheyenne, Wyoming mainline of the Union Pacific Railroad, and along U.S. Route 85, approximately 7 miles north of Greeley, Colorado.

Demographics

As of the census of 2000, there were 2,690 people, 1,033 households, and 765 families residing in the town. The racial makeup of the town was 91.12% White, 0.04% African American, 0.52% Native American, 0.78% Asian, 5.76% from other races, and 1.78% from two or more races. Hispanic or Latino of any race were 12.64% of the population.

There were 1,033 households, out of which 36.7% had children under the age of 18 living with them, 62.0% were married couples living together, 9.1% had a female householder with no husband present, and 25.9% were non-families. 23.0% of all households were made up of individuals, and 13.6% had someone living alone who was 65 years of age or older.  The average household size was 2.60 and the average family size was 3.07.

In the town, the population was spread out, with 28.6% under the age of 18, 7.0% from 18 to 24, 26.6% from 25 to 44, 25.0% from 45 to 64, and 12.8% who were 65 years of age or older.  The median age was 38 years. For every 100 females, there were 90.6 males.  For every 100 females age 18 and over, there were 86.2 males.

The median income for a household in the town was $47,314, and the median income for a family was $55,144. Males had a median income of $38,839 versus $27,292 for females. The per capita income for the town was $20,816.  About 3.4% of families and 5.3% of the population were below the poverty line, including 5.6% of those under age 18 and 10.1% of those age 65 or over.

Notable people
Eaton can claim two active National Football League (NFL) players:

Austin Ekeler, current running back for the Los Angeles Chargers, attended and played high school football for The Fightin' Reds at Eaton High School.
Trent Sieg, current long snapper for the Las Vegas Raiders, also attended Eaton High and played high school football for the Fightin' Reds.

See also

Colorado
Bibliography of Colorado
Index of Colorado-related articles
Outline of Colorado
List of counties in Colorado
List of municipalities in Colorado
List of places in Colorado
List of statistical areas in Colorado
Front Range Urban Corridor
North Central Colorado Urban Area
Denver-Aurora-Boulder, CO Combined Statistical Area
Greeley, CO Metropolitan Statistical Area

References

External links

Town of Eaton website
CDOT map of the Town of Eaton

Towns in Weld County, Colorado
Towns in Colorado

bg:Итън